Chainsaw Dismemberment is the second studio album by American death metal band Mortician, released on June 29, 1999 by Relapse Records.

Track listing

Personnel
Mortician
Will Rahmer - bass, vocals
Desmond Tolhurst - guitar
Roger Beaujard - guitar, drum programming

Production
Roger Beaujard - producer, engineer
Will Rahmer - assistant engineer, photography
Mortician - producers
Matthew F. Jacobson - executive producer
Roger Beaujard - engineer
Dave Shirk - mastering
Wes Benscoter - cover art
Brian Henry - design
Danny Nelson - photography

References

Mortician (band) albums
1999 albums
Albums with cover art by Wes Benscoter